For information on all Florida International University sports, see FIU Panthers

The FIU Panthers baseball team is a varsity intercollegiate athletic team of Florida International University in University Park, Florida, United States. The team is a member of Conference USA, which is part of the National Collegiate Athletic Association's Division I. FIU's first baseball team was fielded in 1973. The team plays its home games at Infinity Insurance Park in Miami, Florida. The Panthers are coached by Rich Witten.

Panthers in Major League Baseball
Since the Major League Baseball Draft began in 1965, FIU has had 137 players selected.

See also
List of NCAA Division I baseball programs

References

External links
 

Sports clubs established in 1973